Thomas Moore House is a historic home located at Poplar Bluff, Butler County, Missouri. It was built in 1896, and is a -story, irregular plan, Queen Anne style frame dwelling with Colonial Revival influenced detailing.  It has a hipped and gable roof and features a projecting polygonal, two-story bay.

It was listed on the National Register of Historic Places in 1998.

References

Houses on the National Register of Historic Places in Missouri
Queen Anne architecture in Missouri
Colonial Revival architecture in Missouri
Houses completed in 1896
Houses in Butler County, Missouri
National Register of Historic Places in Butler County, Missouri